Andrés Ruiz (born 16 July 1988) is a Colombian long distance runner. He finished 79th in the marathon at the 2016 Summer Olympics.

Ruiz is married to Patricia Mojica, they have a daughter Juana Lucia (born 2013). His wife is also a long-distance runner, and competes in the same team at the national level. Ruiz initially wanted to become a cyclist, but could not afford buying a racing bicycle, and eventually changed to running at the age of 16–18. Between 2009 and 2015 he had no sports funding and no personal coach, and hence worked in the family business, and also as a courier and accounting assistant. He received state funding in November 2015.

References

External links

 

1988 births
Living people
Colombian male long-distance runners
Colombian male marathon runners
Athletes (track and field) at the 2016 Summer Olympics
Olympic athletes of Colombia
Sportspeople from Bogotá